Sayn-Wittgenstein-Wittgenstein was a county of the Sauerland of Germany. Sayn-Wittgenstein-Wittgenstein was a partition of Sayn-Wittgenstein, comprising the southern portion of the Wittgenstein County. In 1657, it was partitioned into Sayn-Wittgenstein-Hohenstein and Sayn-Wittgenstein-Vallendar.

Counts of Sayn-Wittgenstein-Wittgenstein (1607–1657)
 Louis II (1607–34)
 John (1634–57)

1657 disestablishments
States and territories established in 1607